The 46th edition of the annual Vuelta a Venezuela was held from Wednesday June 24 to Sunday July 5, 2009.

Stages

2009-06-24: Puerto la Cruz - Puerto la Cruz (80 km)

2009-06-25: Barcelona - El Tigre (175.6 km)

2009-06-26: Anaco Circuito (50 km)

2009-06-26: Aragua de Barcelona - Valle de la Pascua (135 km)

2009-06-27: Valle de la Pascua - Valle de la Pascua (93 km)

2009-06-28: Chaguaramas - Calabozo (169.5 km)

2009-06-29: El Sombrero - San Carlos de Austria (225 km)

2009-06-30: Turén - Turén (35 km)

2009-07-01: Acarigua - Sanaré (163.4 km)

2009-07-02: Quibor - Nirgua (160 km)

2009-07-03: San Felipe Circuito (80 km)

2009-07-04: San Felipe - Turmero (181.5 km)

2009-07-05: Caracas - Caracas (81.6 km)

Final classification

See also 
 2009 Vuelta al Táchira

References 
 wvcycling
 cyclingnews
 live-radsport

Vuelta a Venezuela
Venezuela
Vuelta Venezuela